Jess Hosking (born 2 December 1995) is an Australian rules footballer playing for the Richmond Football Club in the AFL Women's (AFLW). She has an identical twin sister, Sarah, who also plays for Richmond Football Club.  Hosking was drafted by Carlton with their tenth selection and seventy-eighth overall in the 2016 AFL Women's draft. After missing the entire 2017 season due to an anterior cruciate ligament injury, she made her debut in the eight point win against  at Ikon Park in the opening round of the 2018 season.

She was eventually traded alongside picks 55 and 57 in exchange for picks 23 and 40.

Statistics
Statistics are correct to round 3, 2022

|-
| scope="row" text-align:center | 2018
| 
| 11 || 6 || 0 || 3 || 32 || 20 || 52 || 5 ||22 || 0.0 || 0.5 || 5.3 || 3.3 || 8.7 || 0.8 || 3.7
|- style="background:#EAEAEA"
| scope="row" text-align:center | 2019
| 
| 11 || 9 || 0 || 0 || 42 || 21 || 63 || 14 || 18 || 0.0 || 0.0 || 4.7 || 2.3 || 7.0 || 1.6 || 2.0
|-
| scope="row" text-align:center | 2020
| 
| 11 || 6 || 0 || 0 || 45 || 21 || 66 || 22 || 22 || 0.0 || 0.0 || 7.5 || 3.5 || 11.0 || 3.7 || 3.7
|- style="background:#EAEAEA"
| scope="row" text-align:center | 2021
| 
| 11 || 9 || 1 || 1 || 62 || 56 || 118 || 25 || 30 || 0.1 || 0.1 || 6.9 || 6.2 || 13.1 || 2.8 || 3.3
|-
| scope="row" text-align:center | 2022
| 
| 11 || 3 || 0 || 0 || 17 || 8 || 25 || 6 || 9 || 0.0 || 0.0 || 5.7 || 2.7 || 8.3 || 2.0 || 3.0
|-
|- class="sortbottom"
! colspan=3 | Career
! 33
! 1
! 4
! 198
! 126
! 324
! 72
! 101
! 0.0
! 0.1
! 6.0
! 3.8
! 9.8
! 2.2
! 3.1
|}

References

External links

 
 

1995 births
Identical twins
Living people
Carlton Football Club (AFLW) players
Richmond Football Club (AFLW) players
Australian rules footballers from Victoria (Australia)
Victorian Women's Football League players